Icard (pronounced IKE-erd) is a census-designated place (CDP) in Burke County, North Carolina, United States. The population was 2,664 at the 2010 census. It is part of the Hickory–Lenoir–Morganton Metropolitan Statistical Area.

Geography
Icard is located in eastern Burke County at  (35.725807, -81.458381). It is bordered to the east by the town of Hildebran.

U.S. Route 70 is the main local road through the town, leading east  to Hickory and west  to Morganton. Interstate 40 parallels US-70, with access to Icard from Exit 116.

Demographics

2020 census

As of the 2020 United States census, there were 2,452 people, 929 households, and 673 families residing in the CDP.

2000 census
As of the census of 2000, there were 2,734 people, 1,121 households, and 784 families residing in the CDP. The population density was 696.4 people per square mile (268.6/km2). There were 1,198 housing units at an average density of 305.1 per square mile (117.7/km2). The racial makeup of the CDP was 96.89% White, 0.48% African American, 0.15% Native American, 1.79% Asian, 0.18% from other races, and 0.51% from two or more races. Hispanic or Latino of any race were 0.66% of the population.

There were 1,121 households, out of which 32.9% had children under the age of 18 living with them, 54.3% were married couples living together, 11.0% had a female householder with no husband present, and 30.0% were non-families. 26.3% of all households were made up of individuals, and 10.0% had someone living alone who was 65 years of age or older. The average household size was 2.44 and the average family size was 2.92.

In the CDP, the population was spread out, with 24.7% under the age of 18, 7.4% from 18 to 24, 33.5% from 25 to 44, 24.2% from 45 to 64, and 10.2% who were 65 years of age or older. The median age was 36 years. For every 100 females, there were 96.1 males. For every 100 females age 18 and over, there were 92.5 males.

The median income for a household in the CDP was $35,804, and the median income for a family was $42,853. Males had a median income of $25,060 versus $22,675 for females. The per capita income for the CDP was $16,784. About 1.6% of families and 3.4% of the population were below the poverty line, including 1.5% of those under age 18 and 2.3% of those age 65 or over.

Education
The town is served by the Burke County Public Schools system. Some schools in or near the town include:
East Burke Middle School
East Burke High School
    *Notable alumni- Michael Jaquins and Jerome Ramsey 
Hildebran Elementary School
Icard Elementary School

References

Census-designated places in Burke County, North Carolina